Jojoba (botanical name: Simmondsia chinensis)also commonly called  goat nut, deer nut, pignut, wild hazel, quinine nut, coffeeberry, and gray box bushis native to the Southwestern United States. Simmondsia chinensis is the sole species of the family Simmondsiaceae, placed in the order Caryophyllales.

Jojoba is grown commercially to produce jojoba oil, a liquid wax ester extracted from its seed.

Distribution
The plant is a native shrub of the Sonoran Desert, Colorado Desert, Baja California Desert, and California chaparral and woodlands habitats in the Peninsular Ranges and San Jacinto Mountains. It is found in southern California, Arizona, and Utah (U.S.), and Baja California state (Mexico).

Description

The flowers are small and greenish-yellow, with 5–6 sepals and no petals. The plant typically blooms from March to May.

Reproduction
Each plant is dioecious, with hermaphrodites being extremely rare. The mature seed is a hard oval that is dark brown and contains an oil (liquid wax) content of approximately 54%. An average-sized bush produces  of pollen, to which few humans are allergic.

The female plants produce seed from flowers pollinated by the male plants. Jojoba leaves have an aerodynamic shape, creating a spiral effect, which brings wind-borne pollen from the male flower to the female flower. In the Northern Hemisphere, pollination occurs during February and March. In the Southern Hemisphere, pollination occurs during August and September.

Somatic cells of jojoba are tetraploid; the number of chromosomes is 2n = 4x = 52.

Genetics 
The jojoba genome was sequenced in 2020 and reported to be 887-Mb, consisting of 26 chromosomes (2n = 26), and is predicted to have 23,490 protein-coding genes.

Taxonomy
Despite its scientific name Simmondsia chinensis, the plant is not native to China. The botanist Johann Link originally named the species Buxus chinensis, after misreading a collection label "Calif", referring to California, as "China".  Jojoba was collected again in 1836 by Thomas Nuttall who described it as a new genus and species in 1844, naming it Simmondsia californica, but priority rules require that the original specific epithet be used.

The common name "jojoba" originated from O'odham name Hohowi. The common name should not be confused with the similarly written jujube (Ziziphus zizyphus), an unrelated plant species, which is commonly grown in China.

Uses

Jojoba foliage provides year-round food for many animals, including deer, javelina, bighorn sheep, and livestock. Its nuts are eaten by squirrels, rabbits, other rodents, and larger birds.

Only Bailey's pocket mouse, however, is known to be able to digest the wax found inside the jojoba nut. In large quantities, jojoba seed meal is toxic to many mammals. Later this effect was found to be due to simmondsin, which inhibits hunger.  The indigestible wax acts as a laxative in humans.

Native American uses
Native Americans first made use of jojoba. During the early 18th century  Jesuit missionaries on the Baja California Peninsula observed indigenous peoples heating jojoba seeds to soften them. They then used a mortar and pestle to create a salve or buttery substance. The latter was applied to the skin and hair to heal and condition. The O'odham people of the Sonoran Desert treated burns with an antioxidant salve made from a paste of the jojoba nut.

Native Americans also used the salve to soften and preserve animal hides. Pregnant women ate jojoba seeds, believing they assisted during childbirth. Hunters and raiders ate jojoba on the trail to keep hunger at bay.

The Seri, who utilize nearly every edible plant in their domain, do not regard the beans as real food and in the past ate it only in emergencies.

Introduction to Europe
Archibald Menzies was the botanist with the Vancouver Expedition that arrived in Santa Barbara, California in November 1793. He was given fruit and plants of the jojoba by padre of the San Diego Mission. These survived the voyage back to the UK and were planted in the Royal Botanic Gardens at Kew near London.

Contemporary uses

Jojoba is grown for the liquid wax, commonly called jojoba oil, in its seeds. The oil is rare in that it is an extremely long (C36–C46) straight-chain wax ester and not a triglyceride, making jojoba and its derivative jojoba esters more similar to whale oil than to traditional vegetable oils. Jojoba oil has also been discussed as a possible biodiesel fuel, but it cannot be cultivated on a scale to compete with traditional fossil fuels, so its use is restricted to personal care products.

Cultivation
Plantations of jojoba have been established in a number of desert and semi-desert areas, predominantly in Argentina, Australia, Israel, Mexico, Peru and the United States. It is currently the Sonoran Desert's second most economically valuable native plant (overshadowed only by Washingtonia filifera—California fan palms, used as ornamental trees).

Jojoba prefers light, coarsely textured soils. Good drainage and water penetration is necessary. It tolerates salinity and nutrient-poor soils. Soil pH should be between 5 and 8. High temperatures are tolerated by jojoba, but frost can damage or kill plants.   Requirements are minimal, so jojoba plants do not need intensive cultivation. Weed problems only occur during the first two years after planting and there is little damage by insects. Supplemental irrigation could maximize production where rainfall is less than 400 mm. There is no need for high fertilisation, but, especially in the first year, nitrogen increases growth. Jojoba is normally harvested by hand because seeds do not all mature in the same time. Yield is around 3.5 t/ha depending on the age of the plantation.

Selective breeding is developing plants that produce more beans with higher wax content, as well as other characteristics that will facilitate harvesting.

Its ability to withstand high salinity up to 12 ds [m−1 at pH 9) (deciSiemens or ECe  Salt tolerance of crops) and the high value of jojoba products make jojoba an interesting plant for the use of desertification control. It has been used to combat and prevent desertification in the Thar Desert in India.

References

External links 

 USDA Plants Profile for Simmondsia chinensis (jojoba)
 Calflora Database: Simmondsia chinensis (jojoba)
 Jepson Manual (TJM93) treatment of Simmondsia chinensis
 Selected Families of Angiosperms: Rosidae—an explanation of the scientific name
 Newscientist.com: Jojoba oil as biodiesel
 Hort.purdue.edu: Alternative Field Crops Manual
 
 
 Uses and Benefits of Jojoba Oils

Caryophyllales
Crops originating from Mexico
Crops originating from the United States
Flora of Arizona
Flora of Baja California
Flora of California
Flora of the California desert regions
Flora of the Sonoran Deserts
Flora of Utah
Natural history of the California chaparral and woodlands
Natural history of the Colorado Desert
Natural history of the Peninsular Ranges
North American desert flora
Waxes
Dioecious plants
Flora without expected TNC conservation status